Hugh or Hugo (died 1 December 1158) was a French Cistercian and Cardinal.

He was born probably in the diocese of Beauvais and entered the order of Cistercians in Clairvaux. In 1147 he became abbot of Trois-Fontaines. Pope Eugenius III (also a cistercian) created him Cardinal-Bishop of Ostia in the consistory celebrated probably in December 1151. He subscribed the papal bulls between 29 December 1151 and 24 January 1155 and participated in the papal election, 1153 and papal election, 1154. He corresponded with Bernard of Clairvaux. Cistercians venerated him as blessed.

Bibliography

J. M. Brixius, Die Mitglieder des Kardinalkollegiums von 1130-1181, Berlin 1912, p. 55 no. 11

French Cistercians
12th-century French cardinals
Cardinal-bishops of Ostia
1158 deaths
Year of birth unknown